Night Fly is the first mini-album released by Japanese actress and Japanese pop artist Ai Maeda. Pony Canyon released the CD on March 16, 2005. The album's title track "the Beautiful World" was used as the ending to Kino no Tabi, the track titled "Hajimari no Hi" (始まりの日) was used as ending theme for the first animated film "Kino's Journey: In Order to Do Something –Life Goes On– (何かをするために―life goes on.― Nanika o Suru Tame ni –life goes on.–)".

Track listing

Release history

References

2005 albums